Titanosuchidae is an extinct family of dinocephalians.

The titanosuchids were carnivorous to omnivorous (herbivorous?) tapinocephalians. As with other tapinocephalians, they had thick skulls probably for head-butting. They had large canine teeth, and their incisors were very strong.

They are related to other dinocephalians, such as the Tapinocephalidae - a group that includes Moschops. The most famous titanosuchids are Jonkeria and Titanosuchus.

References
L. D. Boonstra, "The Fauna of the Tapinocephalus Zone (Beaufort Beds of the Karoo)", Annals of the South African Museum, 56 (1) 1969, pp. 1–73
Carroll, R. L. Vertebrate paleontology and evolution. -W. H. Freeman and company, New York, 1988
Edwin H. Colbert, Evolution of the Vertebrates, 2nd edition, 1969, John Wiley & Sons
James A. Hopson and Herbert R. Barghusen, "An Analysis of Therapsid Relationships", in The Ecology and Biology of Mammal-Like Reptiles ed. by Nocholas Hotton III, Paul D. MacLean, Jan J. Roth and E. Carol Roth, Smithsonian Institution Press, Washington and London, 1986, pp. 83–106
Gillian M. King, "Anomodontia" Part 17 C, Encyclopedia of Paleoherpetology, Gutsav Fischer Verlag, Stuttgart and New York, 1988

External links
Titanosuchidae at Kheper website.

Tapinocephalians
Guadalupian first appearances
Guadalupian extinctions
Prehistoric therapsid families